Helmersen (earlier Helmes) was noble family which roots came from Hamburg, Germany. Helmersens lived in Sweden and Imperial Russia, including the Governorate of Livonia and Governorate of Estonia.

In 1651, Swedish Queen Christina gave noble status to Paul and Johann Helmes and they became von Helmersen.

Notable members
Gregor von Helmersen
Vasily Helmersen

References

Further reading
 Genealogisches Handbuch der baltischen Ritterschaften, Teil 1, Livland, Bd. 2, Lfg. 9-15, Görlitz 1929, S. 816–834 (digitalized)
 Genealogisches Handbuch der baltischen Ritterschaften, Teil 2, Estland, Bd. 3, Görlitz, 1930, S. 369–370 (digitalized)
 Genealogisches Handbuch der Oeselschen Ritterschaft, Görlitz, 1935, S, 507– 509 (digitalized)
 , : Den med sköldebref förlänade men ej å Riddarhuset introducerade Svenska Adelns Ättartaflor, 1875, S. 120–121 (digitalized)
 Baltische Famgeschichtliche Mitteilungen, Neue Folge 1, 1951, Nr. 4

Baltic nobility